Henei may refer to:
 Henei, the Chinese name of Hanoi, a city in Vietnam.
 Henei Commandery, an ancient administrative division (or commandery) in China, situated in present-day northern Henan.